Samsuddin Ahmed (6 March 1945 – 20 December 2020) was a Bangladesh Awami League politician and a Jatiya Sangsad member representing the Manikganj-2 constituency during 2001–2006.

Background
Ahmed was born in Mirzaganj, Harirampur Upazila, Manikganj District in the then British India in 1945. He graduated from Jagannath College.

Career
Ahmed was elected to parliament from Manikganj-2 as an independent candidate in 2001. He joined Bangladesh Awami League in 2006.

He died on 20 December 2020, from COVID-19, during the COVID-19 pandemic in Bangladesh.

References

1945 births
2020 deaths
People from Manikganj District
8th Jatiya Sangsad members
Awami League politicians
Deaths from the COVID-19 pandemic in Bangladesh